Selmi is a surname. Notable people with the surname include:

Ali Selmi, Tunisian football manager
Ali El Selmi, Egyptian academic
Francesco Selmi, Italian chemist
Habib Selmi (born 1951), Tunisian author
Luca Selmi, Italian chemist
Mustapha Kamel Selmi, Algerian sprinter